Conor Cusack (born 16 January 1979) is an Irish sportsperson. He played hurling with the Cork senior inter-county team in 2006. Known nationally in Ireland for his mental health advocacy, Cusack continues to play hurling with his local Cloyne club. Conor is a former Cork Hurler and a Cork Legend.

Early life
Cusack was born in Cloyne, County Cork in 1979. He was educated locally and currently works as an apprentice electrician. His brother, Donal Óg, is also a hurler as was a cousin, Christy Ring.

Sporting career
Cusack was noted as a good hurler from an early age. He plays with his local Cloyne GAA club and was a member of the Cork senior hurling panel for several years. His brother, Donal Óg, was the goalkeeper on the team.

Cusack made his debut in the 2006 All-Ireland Senior Hurling Championship Final against Kilkenny, coming on as a substitute in the closing minutes.

Personal life
Cusack devotes much of his time to highlighting mental health and articulating his own experiences of depression. He has spoken about this on national television, on Prime Time. In January 2014, Cusack for the first time publicly discussed his attraction to men. Ahead of the 2015 Marriage Equality referendum, he spoke on The Saturday Night Show in favour of the proposition and challenged those who opposed it.

References

External links
 Cusack's writings

1979 births
Living people
Cloyne hurlers
Cork inter-county hurlers
Gay sportsmen
Irish bloggers
Irish electricians
Irish LGBT sportspeople
Mental health activists
LGBT hurlers
Male bloggers
21st-century Irish LGBT people